William E. Blaisdell was an enlisted man in the Regular Army of the United States prior to and during the Mexican–American War. After Mexican War, he returned to civilian life as an inspector in the Boston Customs House. At the commencement of the Civil War he was offered the rank of captain in the Regular Army but instead chose to serve in the Volunteer Army, accepting the rank of lieutenant colonel with the 11th Regiment Massachusetts Volunteer Infantry. He was eventually promoted to colonel and the command of the 11th Massachusetts.  By the summer of 1864, he was in temporary command of the Corcoran Legion. He was killed during the Siege of Petersburg on June 23, 1864 and posthumously received the honorary grade of brevet brigadier general

Early service and Mexican–American War

Civil War

See also

 List of Massachusetts generals in the American Civil War
 Massachusetts in the American Civil War

Notes

References 
 

Union Army generals
1864 deaths
1815 births
Union military personnel killed in the American Civil War